Slovenia competed at the 2018 Mediterranean Games in Tarragona, Spain from 22 June to 1 July 2018.

Medals

Karate 

Tjaša Ristić won the gold medal in the women's kumite 61 kg event. Lina Pušnik won one of the bronze medals in the women's 68 kg event.

Swimming 

Men

Women

References 

Nations at the 2018 Mediterranean Games
2018
2018 in Slovenian sport